Basia (Basia Trzetrzelewska) is a Polish jazz singer-songwriter-producer.

Basia may also refer to:

People

Basia is a female first name, diminutive of Barbara.

Basia A'Hern, Australian actor
Basia Bulat, Canadian singer-songwriter
Basia Frydman, Swedish actress
Basia Johnson, Polish humanitarian
Basia Lyjak, Canadian musician
Basia Wywerkówna, Polish actress
 Basia, a fictional girl appearing in the Polish National Anthem, Poland Is Not Yet Lost

Places
Basia, Pakistan, a small village in Attock District, Punjab
Basia block, a community development block in Gumla district, Jharkhand, India
Basia, Gumla, a village in Jharkhand, India

See also
Argument About Basia, a novel by Kornel Makuszyński
Battle of Basya (Basia) River